The third series of Merlin began on 11 September 2010. Series three regular cast members include Colin Morgan, Bradley James, Katie McGrath, Angel Coulby, Anthony Head, and Richard Wilson, as well as Emilia Fox joining the regular cast. John Hurt took his previous role as the voice of the Great Dragon but was no longer one of the regular cast (though he continued to provide the opening narration for the series). Series three consists of 13 episodes. The series three premiere was watched by 6.49 million viewers.

Series 3 introduced the format of a two-part opener and two-part finale, this format was retained for Series 4 and Series 5. The series was notable for the change in character of Morgana from the sympathetic heroine in the first two series to the villain in series 3, keeping with the historical concept of Morgana as Merlin's nemesis in the legends of King Arthur. BBC officially renewed the show for series 4 on 10 October 2010.

Plot 
Camelot rejoices as the Lady Morgana is found and returned home, however not all is at it seems for Merlin, as he soon learns that Morgana has changed for the worse. Now in league with Morgause, Morgana's powers begin to grow and she becomes a deadly enemy within the walls of Camelot, but with Uther and the kingdom blind to her treachery, can Merlin thwart her plans before she can destroy Camelot?

Loyalties are tested to the limit as a dangerous game is played for the throne. Old friends return to the kingdom, and new enemies grow stronger outside the walls of Camelot. Merlin must be more alert than ever if he is to protect Prince Arthur, for his greatest enemy is now within the castle walls....Morgana. As the King's loving ward plays her game of lies and manipulation, can Merlin stop Morgana before Camelot is lost forever, or is the kingdom set to crumble under the force of secrets and lies?

Cast

Main cast 
 Colin Morgan as Merlin
 Angel Coulby as Gwen
 Bradley James as Arthur
 Katie McGrath as Morgana
 Anthony Head as Uther Pendragon
 Richard Wilson as Gaius

Recurring 
 John Hurt as the Great Dragon (voice)
 Emilia Fox as Morgause
 Rupert Young as Sir Leon
 Eoin Macken as Gwaine
 Adetomiwa Edun as Elyan
 Michael Cronin as Geoffrey of Monmouth
 Tom Ellis as King Cenred
 Alice Patten as Ygraine

Guest stars
 Mark Williams as the Goblin (voice)
 Karl Johnson as Taliesin
 Miriam Margolyes as Grunhilda
 Georgia King as Elena
 Simon Williams as Lord Godwyn
 Warwick Davis as Grettir
 Donald Sumpter as the Fisher King
 Pauline Collins as Alice
 Eddie Marsan as the Manticore (voice)
 Harry Melling as Gilli
 Ralph Ineson as Jarl
 Laura Donnelly as Freya
 Santiago Cabrera as Lancelot
 Tom Hopper as Percival

Episodes

References

2010 British television seasons
Merlin (2008 TV series)